His Hon. Thomas Bateman Napier LLD (1854-6 November 1933), was a British Liberal Party politician and judge.

Family
He was a son of Richard Clay Napier of Preston, and Sarah Bateman of Salford. He was educated at Rugby School and London University. He married first in 1882, Florence Emily Roberts of Upminster, who died in 1915. They had one son who was killed in the Great War, and two daughters. He married second in 1917, Mrs Amy Julia Tootal who died in 1923.

Legal career
During his student days he gained the Incorporated Law Society's Clifford Inn Prize, and Scot. Scholarship, and the Council of Legal Educated's first class International and Roman Law Exhibition, and other law scholarships and prizes. He took a first class in Law at the University of London; honours at Bar Call. Examination. He was elected Fellow and Member of Senate, University of London, in 1895. He became a Justice of the Peace in Middlesex, 1895. He wrote a Concise Practice of the Supreme Court of Justice; The New Land Taxes, 1909–1910. He became Judge of County Courts, in Derbyshire, in 1912.

Political career
He was a Member of the London County Council from 1893 to 1906. He contested Islington North as a Liberal candidate in 1895. He was twice Chairman of Corporate Property, and three times Chairman of Parliamentary Committee, of the London County Council. He sat as Liberal MP for the Faversham Division of Kent from 1906 to 1910. He had gained the seat from the Conservatives at the 1906 General Election

but lost it to them at the next General Election in January 1910. 

He did not stand for parliament again. He was a co-opted Member of the London Educated Committee, 1915. He became a Governor of Rugby School, in 1927.

Sources
Who Was Who
British parliamentary election results 1885–1918, Craig, F. W. S.

References

External links 
Who Was Who; http://www.ukwhoswho.com

1854 births
1933 deaths
UK MPs 1906–1910
Liberal Party (UK) MPs for English constituencies
Members of London County Council
Alumni of the University of London
People educated at Rugby School
English King's Counsel
20th-century English judges
Progressive Party (London) politicians
County Court judges (England and Wales)